Les Espaces du sommeil is a work for baritone and orchestra set to a poem of Robert Desnos by the Polish composer Witold Lutosławski. It is in one movement, with a three-section scheme but lacking clearly marked caesuras, about which Lutosławski stated: "Les Espaces is neither a song nor a set of songs, but a symphonic poem with a baritone solo."

Composed in 1975, it was first performed on 12 April 1978 in Berlin by the baritone Dietrich Fischer-Dieskau and the Berlin Philharmonic Orchestra under the direction of the composer.  The piece is Lutosławski's first composition set to the poetry of Robert Desnos, to which the composer returned in 1990's Chantefleurs et Chantefables.

Composition

Structure
Les Espaces du sommeil lasts 15 minutes and is composed in one movement but with a three-section scheme:
Dans la nuit il y a naturellement les sept merveilles
Il y a toi l'immolée, toi que j'attends
Il y a toi sans doute que je ne connais pas

Instrumentation
The work is scored for solo baritone and a small orchestra consisting of 3 flutes (2 & 3 doubling piccolo), 3 oboes, 3 clarinets in B-flat (3 doubling bass clarinet in B-flat), 3 bassoons, 3 trumpets in C, 4 horns in F, 3 trombones, tuba, percussion, timpani, harp, piano (doubling celesta), and strings.

Reception
Les Espaces du sommeil has been praised by music critics.  Andrew Clements of The Guardian stated that "the orchestral forces of Les Espaces du sommeil, dedicated to the baritone Dietrich Fischer-Dieskau, are substantial and refined."  George Hall of BBC Music Magazine mentioned "the atmospheric (...) setting of Robert Desnos exploring the borderland between waking and dreaming."

See also
List of compositions by Witold Lutosławski

References

Compositions by Witold Lutosławski
1975 compositions
Compositions for symphony orchestra
Classical song cycles in French